Alfred William Stanley Brice (14 November 1880 – 5 May 1959) was a New Zealand cricketer who played first-class cricket for Wellington from 1903 to 1928 and played five times for New Zealand in the days before New Zealand played Test cricket. He was also an early administrator of Rugby league in New Zealand.

He married Mary Silva at Sacred Heart Church in Petone on 24 April 1905.

In a senior club match for Petone in Wellington in March 1918 Brice took 7 for 2 to dismiss the Returned Soldiers' Association team (who batted two short) for 8 in the second innings. He had taken 5 for 13 in the first innings, when the Returned Soldiers' Association team made 45. He took a hat-trick in each innings. He set a wicket-taking record for Wellington senior cricket that season with 93 wickets at an average of 7.19.

References

External links
 
 

1880 births
1959 deaths
New Zealand cricketers
Pre-1930 New Zealand representative cricketers
Wellington cricketers
New Zealand rugby league administrators
People from Rakaia
Cricketers from Canterbury, New Zealand